The 1993 Asian Badminton Championships (officially, Seiko Asian Badminton Men's Team Championships) was the 12th edition of Badminton Asia Championships. It took place from March 31 to April 4, 1993 at the Queen Elizabeth Stadium in Hong Kong. Only the team competition for men's teams was held. Indonesian Men's team won the crown.

Men's team medalists

Division 1 
Men's team of Indonesia won the Asian Championships by defeating China in the final.

Semifinals

Malaysia vs Indonesia

China vs Chinese Taipei 
 4 : 1

Final Round 
The championship winner was the team from Indonesia, ahead of China. In the final on April 4, 1993, the 25-year-old Chinese player Zheng Yumin collapsed in the fourth of five matches of the team fight when Indonesians were leading 2–0. He had to be given mouth-to-mouth breathing assistance and chest compressions before he was rushed to Hospital. Indonesia gave walkover for the last match and won by 3–2.

China vs Indonesia

Division 2 
 Quarter-finals
 5 : 0 

 Semi-finals
 5 : 0 
 5 : 0 

Final
 5 : 0

References

Sources

Badminton Asia Championships
Asian Badminton Championships
1993 Asian Badminton Championships
Badminton Asia Championships
Badminton Asia Championships